Promegapoietin is a drug given during chemotherapy to increase blood cell regeneration. It is a colony-stimulating factor that stimulates megakaryocyte production.

It functions by stimulating ligands for interleukin 3 and c-Mpl.

References

External links
 

Antianemic preparations
Cytokines
Thrombopoietin receptor agonists